Margaret Barnes may refer to:

 Margaret Ayer Barnes (1886–1967), American playwright, novelist and short-story writer
 Margaret Anne Barnes (1927–2007), American writer
 Margaret Barnes (marine biologist) (1919–2009), British marine biologist
 Margaret Barnes of Westminster (16th-century), English tavern keeper, known as Long Meg of Westminster